This is a list of obsolete units of measurement, organized by type. These units of measurement are typically no longer used, though some may be in limited use in various regions. For units of measurement that are unusual but not necessarily obsolete, see List of unusual units of measurement. For units of measurement that are humorous in nature, see List of humorous units of measurement.

Area

 Antsingae – a unit of area, smaller than the bunarium.
 Bunarium (plural "bunaria") – a unit of area, equal to about 120 ares or 12,000 square metres
 Carucate
 Cawnie 
 Decimal
 Dessiatin
 Ground
 Hide
 Juchart
 Jugerum 
 Katha
 Lessa or Lecha
 Marabba
 Morgen
 Oxgang
 Pari – a unit of area equal to about 1 hectare
 Quinaria 
 Tathe 
 Virgate

Energy, etc.
 Poncelet –  unit of power
 Sthène –  unit of force
 Technical atmosphere – a unit of pressure

Length
 Ald
 Alen
 Aṅgula
 Arabic mile
 Arş and Arşın – two Turkish units of length
 Bamboo – also known as the Burmese league
 Barleycorn – one-third of an inch.
 Button – a unit of length which has been used in the UK.
 Cana – a unit of length used in the former Crown of Aragon, at least in Catalonia. It is around the same value as the vara of Aragon, Spain, and Portugal.
 Cubit
 Ell
 Girah
 Guz
 Hat'h
 Jow
 Lachter – a unit of length once used in the mining industry in most of Europe. It was usually used to measure depth, tunnel driving and the size of mining fields; it was also used for contract work. In mining in the German-speaking countries, it was the primary unit of length.
 Line
 Macedonian cubit
 Pace 
 Palm
 Parasang
 Pes 
 Rod
 Sana lamjel
 Spat – a unit of length equal to 
 Stadion
 Step 
 Unglie
 Vara – an Aragonese, Spanish and Portuguese unit
 Yojana – a Vedic measure of distance used in ancient India.

Luminosity

 Candlepower – an obsolete unit expressing luminous intensity equal to 0.981 candela, it expresses levels of light intensity in terms of the light emitted by a candle of specific size and constituents. In modern usage candlepower equates directly to the unit known as the candela.
 Carcel burner – an efficient lighting device used in the nineteenth century for domestic purposes and in France as the standard measure for illumination
 Carcel
 Hefner candle 
 Violle

Mass or weight
 Abucco – in Bago, Myanmar, this was a unit of mass used for gold and silver. It was approximately 196.44 grams or 6.316 troy ounces.
 Arroba – an Iberian unit of weight, equivalent to 11.5 kilograms
 Bag – a standard weight for a bag of cement was 
 Buddam
 Candy
 Corgee – an obsolete unit of mass equal to 212 moodahs, or rush mat bundles of rice. The unit was used in the Canara (now Kanara) region of Karnataka in India.
 Cullingey
 Dharni
 Dirham 
 Duella 
 Dutch cask – a British unit of mass, used for butter and cheese.
 Esterling
 Faggot – has multiple meanings in metrology. As relevant to this article, it was a unit of mass, being .
 Grzywna
 Keel – a UK unit of mass for coal, equalling 
 Large sack – a unit of mass equal to 2 (new) sacks
 Long ton
 Lot
 Mark
 Munjandie
 Oka
 Pao
 Passeree – a unit of mass equal to about 
 Pennyweight
 Pood
 Roll – a U.K. unit of mass for butter and cheese equal to  
 Room – a U.K. unit of mass of coal equivalent to 
 Sarpler
 Ship load
 Slug
 Talent – a unit of mass in the tens of kg
 Tank 
 Tod
 Truss – a unit of mass used to describe tight bundle of hay or straw. It would usually be cuboid, for storage or shipping, and would either be harvested into such bundles or cut from a large rick.
 Whey – a unit of mass used for butter and cheese
 Zentner
 Zolotnik

Temperature
 Delisle scale
 Leiden scale
 Newton scale – a temperature scale devised by Isaac Newton in 1701.
 Réaumur scale
 Rømer scale
 Wedgwood scale

Volume (dry or liquid)

 Acetabulum 
 Adowlie
 Amphora 
 Aum
 Belshazzar
 Botella − The Spanish for "bottle", which has been given various standard capacities at different times and places, and for different fluids. Often-cited figures include 0.95 liters in Cuba (1796), 0.75 liters in Cuba (1862) and 0.7 liters in Colombia (1957).
 Bucket
 Butt
 Chungah
 Congius 
 Coomb
 Cord-foot –  a U.S. unit of volume for stacked firewood with the symbol cd-ft equal to 
 Cotyla 
 Cran
 Cullishigay
 Deal – a former U.K. and U.S. unit of volume for stacked firewood. A U.K. deal equaled 7 ft × 6 ft ×  in, while a U.S. deal equaled 12 ft × 11 in ×  in.
 Demiard – an old French unit of volume. When France metricated, it survived in Louisiana and Quebec. The demiard eventually became associated with the American and British half-pint rather than French units. See the article on the demiard for details.
 Firlot
 Hekat
 Hogshead
 Homer
 House cord – a former U.S. unit of volume for stacked firewood
 Kile 
 Koku
 Lambda – an uncommon metric unit of volume discontinued with the introduction of the SI
 London quarter
 Lump of butter – used in the U.S., up to and possibly after of the American Revolution. It equaled "one well rounded tablespoon".
 Masu
 Metretes
 Octave
 Omer
 Pau
 Peck – the name of two different units of volume, one imperial and one U.S. Both equaled about 9 litres.
 Puddee
 Salt spoon – used in the U.S., up to and possibly after of the American Revolution. Four salt spoons equaled one teaspoon.
 Seah
 Ser
 Shipping ton – a unit of volume defined as 
 Stuck
 Wineglass – used in the U.S., up to and possibly after of the American Revolution. One wineglass equaled  cup.

Other
 Apothecaries' system
 Atom (time) – a hypothetical unit of time used in the Middle Ages
 Bahar – a unit of length in Iran, and was a unit of mass in Oman
 Batman – mostly a unit of mass, but sometimes a unit of area
Demal – unit of concentration
 Dimi (metric prefix) – a discontinued non-SI metric prefix for 10−4
 Fanega – a unit of dry volume, and a unit of area
 Fresnel – a unit of frequency
 Garce – a unit of dry volume in India, and a unit of mass in Sri Lanka
 Hobbit – a unit of volume, or, more rarely, of weight
 Kula – a unit of area in India, and mass in Morocco
 Last – a unit of mass or volume
 League – usually a unit of length, but sometimes a unit of area
 Mache
 Mesures usuelles
 Perch – most commonly a unit of area, but sometimes a unit of length or volume
 Pièze – a unit of pressure
 Quibi – a unit of time equal to 10 minutes. First used in Quibi’s own Super Bowl LIII advertising campaign, this word saw small amounts of ironic adoption.  
 Rood – a unit of area or length
 Sack – originally a medieval unit of mass, equal to 26 stone (364 pounds, or about 165 kg). Since a unit of dry volume, equal to 24 imperial gallons (about 109 liters).
 Schoenus – a unit of area or length
 Scrupulum – a unit of area, mass, or time
 Seam – a unit of mass or volume
 Seer – a unit of mass or volume
 Toise – a unit of area, length, or volume
 Tub – usually a unit of mass, but sometimes a unit of volume
 Uncia – an ancient Roman unit of length, mass, or volume
 Wey – a unit of mass or volume
 Winchester measure – a system of volume measurement

See also

 Hair's breadth
 Hindu units of time
 History of measurement
 List of humorous units of measurement
 List of scientific units named after people
 List of unusual units of measurement
 Medieval weights and measures
 Muggeseggele
 System of measurement

By geography

 Ancient Arabic units of measurement
 Ancient Egyptian units of measurement
 Ancient Greek units of measurement
 Ancient Mesopotamian units of measurement
 Ancient Roman units of measurement
 Danish units of measurement
 Obsolete Finnish units of measurement
 Obsolete German units of measurement
 History of measurement systems in India
 Japanese units of measurement
 List of customary units of measurement in South Asia
 Maltese units of measurement
 Obsolete Polish units of measurement
 Obsolete Russian units of measurement
 Obsolete Scottish units of measurement
 Obsolete Tatar units of measurement
 Old Cornish units of measurement
 Old Irish units of measurement
 Ottoman units of measurement
 Persian units of measurement
 Portuguese customary units
 Roman timekeeping
 Spanish customary units
 Tamil units of measurement

References

Further reading
 Encyclopaedia of Historical Metrology, Weights, and Measures; Jan Gyllenbok; Birkhäuser; 2018; 3 Volumes.
 Historical Metrology: A New Analysis of the Archaeological and the Historical Evidence Relating to Weights and Measures; Algernon Berriman; Praeger; 1970; .

 
Lists of units of measurement